Hans-Adalbert Rürup (born 7 November 1943) is a German economist and former chairman of the German Council of Economic Experts. He was formerly a professor of economics at the Darmstadt University of Technology. From 2010 to 2012, he was president of the International School of Management  in Dortmund. In 2013 he changed into the ISM's board of trustees and took up a position as the president of the newly founded Handelsblatt Research Institute .

See also
Rürup-Rente, part of the private pensions in Germany

References

1943 births
Living people
German economists
University of Cologne alumni
Academic staff of Technische Universität Darmstadt
Commanders Crosses of the Order of Merit of the Federal Republic of Germany